Action in Arabia (also known as Danger in Damascus and International Zone) is a 1944 drama film directed by Leonide Moguy and starring George Sanders and Virginia Bruce.  The film  was based on the novel The Fanatic of Fez by M. V. Heberden. Action in Arabia was written by Philip MacDonald and Herbert J. Biberman.  The supporting cast includes Gene Lockhart and Robert Armstrong, and the plot involves trouble and intrigue with the Nazis in Damascus, who scheme to seize control of the Suez Canal.

Plot
In the spring of 1941, American journalist Michael Gordon (George Sanders) and his colleague, William Chalmers (Robert Anderson), arrive in Damascus. When Chalmers is murdered, Gordon sets out to find out why. He is helped along by glamorous secret agent Yvonne (Virginia Bruce), who is on the trail of a group of Nazi saboteurs. Intrigue centers around the actions of Josef Danesco (Gene Lockhart) who offers to sell information, as well as French diplomatic official Andre Leroux (André Charlot) and Eric Latimer (Alan Napier), the owner of the Hotel International, both suspected of having connections with the Nazis.

Gordon enlists the help of Mathew Reed (Robert Armstrong), a member of the American Consulate and uncovers a plot to maneuver the Arabs into an  insurrection as a diversion for an attack on the Suez Canal by the Nazis. Abdul El Rashid (H.B. Warner), the revered Arab leader, has been deceived by Kareem (Jamiel Hasson), a pro-Nazi chieftain.  When Gordon proves Leroux to be a German provocateur to Abdul El Rashid, it results in the deaths of Reed and Leroux and the wounding of Gordon, but the plot to attack the Suez Canal is thwarted.

Cast
As appearing in Action in Algeria, (main roles and screen credits identified):
 George Sanders as Michael Gordon  
 Virginia Bruce as Yvonne Danesco  
 Lenore Aubert as Mounirah al-Rashid  
 Gene Lockhart as Josef Danesco  
  Robert Armstrong as Matthew Reed  
 H.B. Warner as Abdul El Rashid  
 Alan Napier as Eric Latimer  
 André Charlot as Andre Leroux (as Andre Charlot)  
 Marcel Dalio as Chakka - Arab Henchman at Airport  
 Robert Anderson as William Chalmers (credited as Robert Andersen)  
 Jamiel Hasson as Eben Kareem

Production

Development
In April 1943 RKO announced they had bought the rights to an original story, The Fanatic of Fez, about the work of American agents in Africa prior to the invasion of Africa. (A novelisation of the story was published in May 1943.

George Sanders had just finished a long term contract with 20th Century Fox and signed a three-picture deal with RKO of which this was to be the first.

Shooting
Filming started on 1 October 1943 under the title International Zone.

As world events turned to North Africa, the original setting of Algiers was dropped and Damascus became the locale, with a budget increase of $100,000 given to elevate the film to a higher status. (The New York Times said this was a 100% increase and it happened three weeks into filming.) The title was changed to Action in Arabia during filming. Shooting was delayed a week due to an illness to Virginia Bruce. (Another title was  Danger in Damascus.

Set mainly on the RKO backlot, the production relied on the customary sets that had been used in a variety of other films including Gone with the Wind (1939).

In the opening scene, the Capelis XC-12 appears as an airliner; the venerable movie prop had been used in a number of films including RKO's Five Came Back (1939) and Republic's Flying Tigers (1942).

Action in Arabia does include a number of scenes of Arab life including a desert scene with numerous extras, horses and camel caravans. Years earlier, filmmakers Ernest B. Schoedsack and Merian C. Cooper had shot footage for an unrealized film about Lawrence of Arabia,  that they were planning as a follow-up to their hit, King Kong (1933). This footage was integrated into Action in Arabia.

Reception
Bosley Crowther of The New York Times reviewed Action in Arabia, considering it better than the standard "B" film fare. "... 'Action in Arabia' is the sort of buncombe you get in the muscular fiction field. Not that it isn't pleasant buncombe. Leonide Moguy has directed it for that flair of exaggeration which distinguished the best B-grade intrigues."

See also
 List of American films of 1944

References

Notes

Bibliography

 Maltin, Leonard. Leonard Maltin's Movie Encyclopedia. New York: Dutton, 1994. .

External links
 
 
 
 

1944 films
1940s war films
American black-and-white films
American spy films
American war films
Films scored by Roy Webb
Films directed by Léonide Moguy
Films set in Damascus
RKO Pictures films
World War II films made in wartime
World War II spy films
1940s spy films
1940s English-language films